Fred Belardi (born December 30, 1942) is a former Democratic member of the Pennsylvania House of Representatives.

Belardi attended Scranton Technical High School, Penn State Scranton, and Wilkes College.

References

External links
 official PA House profile (archived)
 official Party website (archived)

Living people
Democratic Party members of the Pennsylvania House of Representatives
1942 births
Pennsylvania State University alumni